Ptiloscola dargei is a moth of the family Saturniidae first described by Claude Lemaire in 1971. It is found in Mexico.

References

Moths described in 1971
Ceratocampinae